Lynn Willis (died January 18, 2013) was a wargame and role-playing game designer, best known for his work with Metagaming Concepts, Game Designers' Workshop (GDW), and Chaosium.

Biography
Willis began by designing science fiction wargames for Metagaming Concepts, starting with Godsfire in 1976. He designed the MicroGames Olympica (1978) and Holy War (1979). Chaosium published Lords of the Middle Sea (1978), and Willis joined Chaosium in 1978. GDW published Bloodtree Rebellion (1979). Willis's relationship with Chaosium proved the most enduring; he would turn to role-playing games. He helped founder Greg Stafford trim and refine the RuneQuest rules into Basic Role-Playing, the rules that would serve as the base for many of Chaosium's RPG lines. He wrote the Call of Cthulhu campaign The Masks of Nyarlathotep (1984) with Larry DiTillio. He was included in the design credits for Worlds of Wonder (1982) and the Ringworld RPG (1984).

With other members of Chaosium, he co-wrote the Ghostbusters RPG for West End Games, which won the H.G. Wells Award for Best Role-playing Rules of 1986.  Willis co-designed the fifth edition of Call of Cthulhu with Sandy Petersen, and replaced Keith Herber as line editor of Cthulhu when Herber left Chaosium in 1994. He worked with Petersen again for the sixth edition of Call of Cthulhu. Willis created the game Elric! with Richard Watts as a new Basic Role-Playing version of Stormbringer. After Greg Stafford left Chaosium in 1998, Willis stayed on as editor-in-chief.

Willis left Chaosium in late 2008 due to ill health; at the time, he was the longest serving Chaosium employee, with 30 years of experience with the company.

Death
On September 11, 2008, the President of Chaosium, Charlie Krank, informed the public that Willis had been diagnosed with Parkinson's disease. Willis died on January 18, 2013.

References

External links

Official Chaosium Staff profile of Willis 

Board game designers
2013 deaths
Year of birth missing
Place of birth missing
Chaosium game designers
Role-playing game designers
Neurological disease deaths in the United States
Deaths from Parkinson's disease
American game designers